The 2003 Bayern Rundfahrt was the 15th edition of the Bayern Rundfahrt cycle race and was held on 21–25 May 2003. The race started in Grassau and finished in Höchstadt an der Aisch. The race was won by Michael Rich.

General classification

References

Bayern-Rundfahrt
2003 in German sport